Sakachep also known as Khelma, is a Central Kuki-Chin-Mizo language of Northeast India. Dialects are Khelma, Thangachep, and Sakachep (Ethnologue). VanBik (2009) classifies Sakachep as closely related to Hmar.

Geographical distribution
Ethnologue reports the following locations for Sakachep.

Karbi Anglong district, Dima Hasao district (formerly North Cachar Hills district), and Cachar district of Assam
Khelma village, Kohima district, Nagaland
Saithsma, Rumphung, and Mongor villages of Jaintia Hills district, Meghalaya
Tripura
Mizoram
Manipur

References

Kuki-Chin languages
Languages of Assam
Languages of Manipur
Languages of Meghalaya
Languages of Mizoram
Languages of Nagaland